Paul Charles Wheatley (born 27 May 1938) is an  Anglican priest who was the Archdeacon of Sherborne and Rector of West Stafford in Dorset from 1991 to 2003.

Wheatley was educated at Durham University and ordained deacon in 1964 and priest in 1985. Following a curacy in Bishopston he was youth chaplain in the Diocese of Bristol from 1963 to 1968. He held incumbencies in Dorcan and Ross on Wye before his archdeacon’s appointment.

References

1938 births
Alumni of Durham University
Archdeacons of Sherborne
Living people